Emery Hyslop-Margison (born 1957) is a Canadian professor of education, and an author of six books and numerous scholarly articles. He held a Canada Research Chair with a focus on democratic learning in 2005–2007.

Hyslop-Margison received his PhD from Simon Fraser University in 2001. His dissertation argued for the liberalization of vocational and career education based on the concern that these programs indoctrinated students into a neo-liberal mindset (Hyslop-Margison, 2005). Much of his work challenges contemporary neo-liberal values that situate economic objectives as the sole purpose of education (Hyslop-Margison, 2007).

Hyslop-Margison's most recent scholarship argues that neo-liberalism is no longer sustained through ideological manipulation, but increasingly through the use of brute force, or the repressive state apparatus (Althusser, 1971). This shift is manifested, in part, through the international trend toward the election of right wing political parties, including the election of Donald Trump as U.S. President.

Books
Neo-liberalism, globalization and human capital learning reclaiming education for democratic citizenship by Emery J Hyslop-Margisonn and Alan M Sears (2006)
Scientism and education : empirical research as neo-liberal ideology. by  Emery J Hyslop-Margison and M Ayaz Naseem (2007)
Liberalizing vocational study : democratic approaches to career education by Emery J Hyslop-Margison (2005)
Paulo Freire : teaching for freedom and transformation: the philosophical influences on the work of Paulo Freire by John A Dale; Emery J Hyslop-Margison (2010)
Teaching democracy : citizenship education as critical pedagogy by Emery J Hyslop-Margison; James Thayer (2009)

References

Althusser, L. (1971). Lenin and philosophy and other essays. New York, NY: Monthly Review Press.
Hyslop-Margison, E.J. (2005). Liberalizing vocational study: Democratic approaches to career education. Lanham, MD: University Press of America. 
Hyslop-Margison, E. J., & Naseem, A. (2007). Career Education as Humanization: A Freirean Approach to Lifelong Learning. Alberta Journal of Educational Research, 53 (4), 347-358.

1957 births
Living people
Canada Research Chairs
Academic staff of the University of New Brunswick
Simon Fraser University alumni